Feng Fei (born December 1962) is a Chinese politician, serving as the Communist Party secretary of Hainan since 2023. He has additionally been the governor of Hainan since December 2020.

Biography 
Feng Fei was born in Duchang County, Jiangxi. He graduated from Tianjin University in 1991, majoring automatic control. He had been served as the Deputy Minister of Industry and Information Technology (2015–2016), Deputy Governor of Zhejiang Province (2016–2020), and Executive Deputy Governor of Zhejiang Province (2017–2020).

In December 2020, Feng was named the Deputy Party Secretary and acting Governor of Hainan. He was elected as the Governor in January 2021.

Feng is a delegate to the 13th National People's Congress.

Reference 

1962 births
Living people
Tianjin University alumni
Chinese Communist Party politicians from Jiangxi
Politicians from Jiujiang
Governors of Hainan
Delegates to the 13th National People's Congress
Members of the 20th Central Committee of the Chinese Communist Party